This is a list of lakes of Ontario beginning with the letter D.

Da
Dace Lake (Manitoulin District) 
Dace Lake (Nipissing District) 
Dace Lake (Sudbury District) 
Dack Lake 
Dacy Lake 
Dad Lake (Algoma District) 
Dad Lake (Rainy River District) 
Dadson Lake 
Daer Lake 
Dafoe Lake (Hastings County) 
Dafoe Lake (Thunder Bay District) 
Dagger Lake (Haliburton County) 
Dagger Lake (Thunder Bay District) 
Dagimabrop Lake 
Dagmar Lake 
Dagny Lake 
Dagwood Lake 
Dahinda Lake 
Dahlin Lake 
Dai Lake 
Dainty Lake (Parry Sound District) 
Dainty Lake (Kenora District) 
Daisy Lake (Algoma District) 
Daisy Lake (Greater Sudbury) 
Daisy Lake (Nipissing District) 
Daisy Lake (Thunder Bay District) 
Daisy Mae Lake 
Dakota Lake 
Dale Lake 
Dales Lake 
Daley Lake 
Dalgas Lake 
Dalglish Lake 
Dalhousie Lake 
Dallaire Lake 
Dallas Lake 
Dalrymple Lake 
D'Alton Lake 
Dalton Lake (Timiskaming District) 
Dalton Lake (Thunder Bay District) 
Daly Lake 
Dam Lake (Renfrew County) 
Dam Lake (Thunder Bay District) 
Damer Lake 
Damn Lake 
Damocles Lake 
Damon Lake 
D'Amour Lake 
Dan Lake (Nipissing District) 
Dan Lake (Sudbury District) 
Dan Lake (Muskoka District) 
Dan Lake (Frontenac County) 
Dan's Lake 
Dana Lake (Cochrane District) 
Dana Lake (Algoma District) 
Danae Lake 
Danby Lake (Thunder Bay District) 
Danby Lake (Frontenac County) 
Danford Lake 
Daniel Lake 
Daniels Lake 
Dankert Lake 
Danny Lake (Thunder Bay District) 
Danny Lake (Algoma District) 
Dans Lake 
Daoust Lake 
Daphne Lake 
Dara Lake 
Darbon Lake 
Darby Lake (Timiskaming District) 
Darby Lake (Rainy River District) 
Darce Lake 
D'Arcy Lake (Sudbury District) 
D'Arcy Lake (Thunder Bay District) 
Dark Lake (Kenora District) 
Dark Lake (Hastings County) 
Dark Lake (Muskoka District) 
Dark Lake (Algoma District) 
Dark Lake (Timiskaming District) 
Darkness Lake 
Darkwater Lake (Forgie Township, Kenora District)
Darkwater Lake (Rainy River District) 
Darkwater Lake (GTP Block 7 Township, Kenora District)
Darling Lake (Kenora District) 
Darling Lake (Frontenac County) 
Darling Long Lake 
Darling Round Lake 
Darlington's Lake 
D'Armour Lake 
Darragh Lake 
Darrell Lake 
Darrow Lake 
Dart Lake 
D'Artagnan Lake 
Dartford Pond 
Darwin Lake 
Dasent Lake 
Dash Lake (Rainy River District) 
Dash Lake (Thunder Bay District) 
Dashwa Lake 
Daughter Lake 
Dave Lake (Cochrane District) 
Dave Lake (Plourde Township, Algoma District)
Dave Lake (Sudbury District) 
Dave Lake (Saunders Township, Algoma District)
Davern Lake 
David Lake (Frost Township, Algoma District)
David Lake (Butt Township, Nipissing District)
David Lake (Rainy River District) 
David Lake (Elliot Lake)
David Lake (Sudbury District) 
David Lake (Kenora District) 
David Lake (Odlum Township, Algoma District)
David Lake (Temagami)
David Lakes 
David Thompson Lake 
David's Lake 
Davidson Lake (Fog Creek, Thunder Bay District)
Davidson Lake (Matachewan)
Davidson Lake (Stirling Township, Thunder Bay District)
Davidson Lake (Kenora District) 
Davidson Lake (Van Hise Township, Timiskaming District)
Davidson Lake (Beeva Creek, Thunder Bay District)
Davidson's Lake 
Davieaux Lake 
Davies Lake (Muskoka District) 
Davies Lake (Algoma District) 
Davies Lake (Thunder Bay District) 
Davies Lake (Kenora District) 
Davis Lake (Frontenac County) 
Davis Lake (Carnegie Township, Cochrane District)
Davis Lake (Sudbury District) 
Davis Lake (Tolstoi Township, Cochrane District)
Davis Lake (Algoma District) 
Davis Lake (Haliburton County) 
Davis Lake (Thunder Bay District) 
Davis Lake (Kenora District) 
Davis Pond 
Davison Lake (Rainy River District) 
Davison Lake (Thunder Bay District) 
Davy Lake 
Dawdy Lake 
Dawn Lake (Algoma District) 
Dawn Lake (Thunder Bay District) 
Dawn Lake (Nipissing District) 
Dawson Lake (Kenora District) 
Dawson Lake (Kashabowie Lake, Thunder Bay District)
Dawson Lake (Black Bay Peninsula, Thunder Bay District)
Dawson Lake (Miniss River, Thunder Bay District)
Dawson Ponds 
Day Lake (Camp Creek, Rainy River District)
Day Lake (Griffin Township, Cochrane District)
Day Lake (McCaul Township, Rainy River District) 
Day Lake (Thunder Bay District) 
Day Lake (Parry Sound District) 
Day Lake (Wacousta Township, Cochrane District)
Day Lake (Sudbury District) 
Dayle Lake 
Dayohessarah Lake 
Days Lake 
Daystar Lake 
Dazzle Lake

De
Dea Lake 
Deacon Lake (Partridge Lake, Kenora District)
Deacon Lake (Knicely Township, Kenora District) 
Deacon Lake (Nipissing District) 
Deacon Lake (Rainy River District) 
Deacon Lake (Kenora)
Deacon Lake (Sudbury District) 
Deacon Lake (Emry Township, Algoma District)
Deacon Lake (Timiskaming District) 
Dead Dog Lake 
Dead Horse Lake (Parry Sound District) 
Dead Horse Lake (Algoma District) 
Dead Horse Lake (Thunder Bay District) 
Dead Horse Lake (Haliburton County) 
Dead Lake (McConnell Township, Sudbury District) 
Dead Lake (Greenstone)
Dead Lake (Algoma District) 
Dead Lake (Kenora District) 
Dead Lake (Cecile Township, Thunder Bay District)
Dead Lake (Manitouwadge)
Dead Lake (Biscotasi Township, Sudbury District)
Dead Moose Lake 
Dead Otter Lake (Thunder Bay District) 
Dead Otter Lake (Algoma District) 
Dead Shot Lake 
Deaddog Lake 
Deadfish Lake 
Deadhead Lake 
Deadman Lake 
Deadman's Lake 
Deadtree Lake 
Deadwood Lake 
Deak Lake 
Dean Lake (Kenora District) 
Dean Lake (Algoma District) 
Dean Lake (Sudbury District)
Dean Lake (Nipissing District) 
Dean Lake (Greater Sudbury)
Deans Lake 
Deans Pond 
Dearden Lake 
Death Lake 
Deatys Lake 
Deavy Lake 
Deb Lake 
DeBaere Lake 
De Blicquy Lake 
De Bois Lake 
Debris Lake 
Decair Lake 
Decarie Lake 
Deception Lake (Boys Township, Kenora District)
Deception Lake (GTP Block 10 Township, Kenora District)
Deception Lake (Hastings County) 
Deception Lake (Thunder Bay District) 
Deception Lake (Cochrane District) 
Decision Lake 
Deckers Lake 
De Courcey Lake 
DeCourcey Lake 
Decoy Lake (Thunder Bay District) 
Decoy Lake (Nipissing District) 
Decross Lake 
Dedee Lake 
Dedo Lake 
Deebank Lake 
Deecee Lake 
Deeds Lake 
Deek Lake 
Deep Lake (Acadia Township, Sudbury District)
Deep Lake (Macklem Township, Timmins)
Deep Lake (Thunder Bay District) 
Deep Lake (Parry Sound District) 
Deep Lake (Miller Township, North Frontenac)
Deep Lake (Melrose Township, Sudbury District)
Deep Lake (Mount Joy Township, Timmins)
Deep Lake (Clarendon Township, North Frontenac)
Deep Lake (Renfrew County) 
Deep Lake (Algoma District) 
Deep Water Lake 
Deer Lake (Telfer Township, Sudbury District)
Deer Lake (Bradshaw Township, Kenora District)
Deer Lake (Bevin Township, Sudbury District)
Deer Lake (Deer Lake)
Deer Lake (Booth Township, Thunder Bay District)
Deer Lake (Manitoulin District) 
Deer Lake (Muskoka District) 
Deer Lake (Algoma District) 
Deer Lake (Lount Township, Parry Sound District)
Deer Lake (Nipissing District) 
Deer Lake (Rainy River District) 
Deer Lake (Wintering Lake, Kenora District)
Deer Lake (Armour)
Deer Lake (Dorion)
Deer Lake (Kawartha Lakes) 
Deer Lake (Lanark County) 
Deer Lake (Haliburton County) 
Deer Lake (Hastings County) 
Deer Lake (Frontenac County) 
Deer Lake (Cochrane District) 
Deer Lake (Laberge Township, Thunder Bay District)
Deer Lake (Truman Township, Sudbury District)
Deer Yard Lake 
Deerfoot Lake 
Deerhorn Lake 
Deerhound Lake 
Deermeadow Lake 
Deerock Lake 
Deerskin Lake 
Deerskull Lake 
Defoe Lake 
De Gaulle Lake 
DeGraff Lake 
Dehoux Lake 
Deils Lake 
Del Lake 
Delahey Lake 
Delaney Lake (Algoma District) 
Delaney Lake (Sudbury District) 
Delaney Lake (Kenora District) 
Delaney Lake (Nipissing District) 
Delano Lake 
Delbridge Lake
De Lesseps Lake
Delhi Lake 
Deline Lake 
Delink Lake 
Delisle Lake 
Dell Lake (Cochrane District) 
Dell Lake (Parry Sound District) 
Dell Lake (Rainy River District) 
Dellaires Lake 
Dello Lake 
Delmage Lake 
Delmer Lake 
Delorosbil Lake 
Delos Lake 
Delta Lake 
De Lucia Lake 
Deluge Lake 
Delusion Lake 
Deman Lake 
Demarco Lake (Cochrane District) 
Demarco Lake (Renfrew County) 
Demars Lake 
Demers Lake 
Demijohn Lake 
Demott Lake 
Dempseys Lake 
Dempster Lake (Sudbury District) 
Dempster Lake (Thunder Bay District) 
Dempster Lake (Kenora District) 
Demuth Lake 
Den Lake 
Denbigh Lake 
Denbigh Long Lake 
Dendroica Lake 
Denedus Lake 
Denis Lake (Lennox and Addington County) 
Denis Lake (Parry Sound District) 
Denis Lake (Thunder Bay District) 
Denison Lake (Elliot Lake)
Denison Lake (Groiseilliers Township, Algoma District)
Denmark Lake (Atikwa River, Kenora District)
Denmark Lake (Benelux Creek, Kenora District)
Denna Lake 
Dennie Lake (Thunder Bay District) 
Dennie Lake (Sudbury District) 
Dennies Lake 
Dennis Lake (Thunder Bay District) 
Dennis Lake (Kenora District) 
Dennis Lake (Nipissing District) 
Dennison Lake 
Dent Lake (Renfrew County) 
Dent Lake (Cochrane District) 
Denton Lake 
Denvic Lake 
Denyes Lake 
De Palma Lake 
Departure Lake 
Depensiers Lake 
Deplanche Lake 
Deposit Lake 
Depot Lake (Algoma District) 
Depot Lake (Sudbury District) 
Depot Lake (Haliburton County) 
Depot Lake (Nipissing District) 
Deratnay Lake 
Derby Lake 
Deresti Lake 
Derniere Lake (Sudbury District) 
Derniere Lake (Kenora District) 
Derraugh Lake 
Derry Lake (Algoma District)
Derry Lake (Hastings County)
Derry Lake (Kenora District)
Desayeux Lake 
Desbarats Lake 
Desbiens Lake 
Desbois Lake (Algoma District) 
Desbois Lake (Sudbury District) 
Deschamp Lake 
Deschamps Lake 
Deschênes Lake 
Desert Lake (Timiskaming District) 
Desert Lake (Frontenac County) 
Deserted Lake 
Deshane Lake 
Desolation Lake 
Desperation Lake 
Despond Lakes 
Detach Lake 
Detector Lake 
Detour Lake (Thunder Bay District) 
Detour Lake (Kenora District) 
Detour Lake (Laidlaw Township, Cochrane District)
Detour Lake (Detour River, Cochrane District)
Dettbarn Lake 
Deuce Lake 
Deugo Lake 
Deutzia Lake 
Devanney Lake 
Devereaux Lake 
Devil Lake (Nipissing District) 
Devil Lake (Thunder Bay District) 
Devil Lake (Frontenac County) 
Devil's Lake (Haliburton County) 
Devil's Lake (Algoma District) 
Devils Bay Lake 
Devils Gap Lake 
Devils Hole 
Devils Lake (Renfrew County) 
Devils Lake (Peterborough County) 
Devils Punch Bowl Lake 
Devine Lake (Rainy River District) 
Devine Lake (Nipissing District) 
Devine Lake (Muskoka District) 
Devious Lake 
Devizes Lake 
Devlin Lake (Algoma District) 
Devlin Lake (Timiskaming District) 
Devlin Lake (Kenora District)
De Volve Lake
Devon Lake (Renfrew County) 
Devon Lake (Sudbury District) 
Devonshire Lake 
Devork Lake 
Devos Lake 
Dew Lake 
Dewan Lake 
Dewar Lake (Kenora District) 
Dewar Lake (Cochrane District) 
Dewdney Lake 
Dewey Lake 
Dewfish Lake 
Dewhirst Lake 
De Witt Lake 
Dewy Lake 
Dexter Lake (Thunder Bay District) 
Dexter Lake (Sudbury District) 
Dey's Pond

Di
Diabase Lake (Van Hise Township, Timiskaming District)
Diabase Lake (Sudbury District) 
Diabase Lake (Brigstocke Township, Timiskaming District)
Diablo Lake 
Diamond Drill Lake 
Diamond Lake (Cochrane District) 
Diamond Lake (Algoma District) 
Diamond Lake (Timiskaming District) 
Diamond Lake (Kenora District) 
Diamond Lake (Parry Sound District) 
Diamond Lake (Hastings County) 
Diamond Lake (Renfrew County) 
Diamond Lake (Sudbury District) 
Diamond Lake (Nipissing District) 
Dianthus Lake 
Dibben Lake 
Dibble Lake 
Dick Lake (Algoma District) 
Dick Lake (Sudbury District) 
Dick Lake (Thunder Bay District) 
Dick Lake (Nipissing District) 
Dick Lake (Parry Sound District) 
Dickens Lake 
Dickens Long Lake 
Dickenson Lake 
Dicker Lake 
Dickey Lake 
Dickie Lake (Thunder Bay District) 
Dickie Lake (Algoma District) 
Dickie Lake (Muskoka District) 
Dickison Lake 
Dicks Lake 
Dickson Lake (Cochrane District) 
Dickson Lake (Thunder Bay District) 
Dickson Lake (Nipissing District) 
Die Lake 
Diene Lake 
Dight Lake 
Dike Pond 
Dill Lake (Grenoble Township, Algoma District)
Dill Lake (Esquega Township, Algoma District)
Dilla Lake 
Dillabough Lake (Kenora District) 
Dillabough Lake (Timiskaming District) 
Dillen Lake 
Dillon Lake (Sudbury District) 
Dillon Lake (Algoma District) 
Dillons Pond 
Dillow Lakes 
Dils Lake 
Dime Lake 
Dimock Lake 
Dimple Lake 
Ding Lake 
Dingee Lake 
Dingley Lake 
Dingman Lake 
Dinkin Lake 
Dinner Lake (Nipissing District) 
Dinner Lake (Parry Sound District) 
Dinner Lake (Rainy River District) 
Dinnick Lake 
Dinny Lake (Timiskaming District) 
Dinny Lake (Algoma District) 
Dinorwic Lake 
Dinwiddie Lake 
Dionne Lake 
Dip Lake 
Dipinto Lake 
Dipneedle Lake 
Dipper Lake 
Direct Lake 
Dirty Lake 
Dirtywater Lake 
Disbrowe Lake 
Discovery Lake (Kenora District) 
Discovery Lake (Thunder Bay District) 
Dishaw Lake 
Dishnish Lake 
Dishpan Lake 
Disk Lake 
Dismal Lake (Way-White Township, Algoma District)
Dismal Lake (Larkin Township, Algoma District)
Dismal Lake (Sudbury District) 
Disraeli Lake 
Distant Lake 
District Lake 
Div Lake 
Dive Lake 
Diver Lake (Sudbury District) 
Diver Lake (Nipissing District) 
Diversion Lake 
Divide Lake (Timiskaming District) 
Divide Lake (Sioux Narrows-Nestor Falls)
Divide Lake (Viking Lake, Kenora District) 
Divided Lake 
Dividing Lake (Haliburton County) 
Dividing Lake (Sudbury District) 
Division Lake 
Dixie Lake (Renfrew County) 
Dixie Lake (Haliburton County) 
Dixie Lake (Kenora District) 
Dixon Lake (Hoey Township, Sudbury District)
Dixon Lake (Schembri Township, Sudbury District)
Dixon Lake (Lanark County) 
Dixon Lake (Timiskaming District) 
Dixon Lake (Hastings County) 
Dizzy Lake (Kenora District) 
Dizzy Lake (Nipissing District)

Do
Doan Lake 
Doats Lake 
Dobbie Lake (Sudbury District) 
Dobbie Lake (Lanark County) 
Dobbs Lake (Parry Sound District) 
Dobbs Lake (Algoma District) 
Dobie Lake (Timiskaming District) 
Dobie Lake (Kenora District) 
Dobie Lake (Algoma District) 
Dobson Lake 
Doc Greig Lake 
Docker Lake 
Docks Lake 
Doctor Lake (Parry Sound District) 
Doctor Lake (Lanark County) 
Doctor's Pond 
Dodd Lake (Thunder Bay District) 
Dodd Lake (Sudbury District) 
Dodds Lake (Frontenac County) 
Dodds Lake (Rabazo Township, Algoma District)
Dodds Lake (Renfrew County) 
Dodds Lake (Arnott Township, Algoma District)
Dodds Lake (Cochrane District) 
Dodds Pond 
Dodge Lake (Renfrew County) 
Dodge Lake (Frontenac County) 
Dodge Lake (Algoma District) 
Dody Lake 
Doe Lake (Parry Sound District) 
Doe Lake (Thunder Bay District) 
Doe Lake (Nipissing District) 
Doe Lake (Cochrane District) 
Doe Lake (Muskoka District) 
Doe Lake (Frontenac County) 
Dog Lake (Lessard Township, Algoma District)
Dog Lake (Noonan Lake, Kenora District)
Dog Lake (Kaministiquia River, Thunder Bay District)
Dog Lake (Severn River, Kenora District)
Dog Lake (Yesno Township, Thunder Bay District)
Dog Lake (Lennox and Addington County) 
Dog Lake (Nipissing District) 
Dog Lake (North Frontenac)
Dog Lake (Dog Creek, Kenora District)
Dog Lake (Keys Lake, Kenora District)
Dog Lake (Riggs Township, Algoma District)
Dog Lake (South Frontenac)
Dog Lake (Parry Sound District) 
Dog Lake (Central Frontenac)
Dogfish Lake 
Dogfly Lake 
Doghole Lake 
Dogpaw Lake 
Dogtooth Lake 
Dogue Lake 
Doherty Lake (Pelletier Township, Algoma District)
Doherty Lake (Abotossaway Township, Algoma District)
Doidge Lake 
Doig Lake (Lennox and Addington County) 
Doig Lake (Timiskaming District) 
Dokis Lake (Sudbury District) 
Dokis Lake (Timiskaming District) 
Dokis Lake (Cochrane District) 
Dolan Lake (Thunder Bay District) 
Dolan Lake (Nipissing District) 
Dole Lake 
Doley Lake 
Dollar Lake 
Dollars Lake 
Dolly Lake (Thunder Bay District) 
Dolly Lake (Nipissing District) 
Dollyberry Lake 
Dolores Lake 
Domain Lake 
Doman Lake 
Dome Lake (Kenora District) 
Dome Lake (Thunder Bay District) 
Dominic Lake 
Dominick Lake 
Dominion Lake (Barrett Township, Kenora District)
Dominion Lake (Lake of the Woods, Kenora District)
Don Lake (Gooch Creek, Kenora District)
Don Lake (Don Creek, Kenora District)
Don Lake (Muskeg River, Kenora District)
Don's Lake 
Dona Lake 
Donahue Lake (Thunder Bay District) 
Donahue Lake (Lennox and Addington County) 
Donahue Long Lake 
Donald Lake (Kenora District) 
Donald Lake (Sudbury District) 
Donald Lake (Thunder Bay District) 
Donald Lakes 
Donaldson Lake (Kenora District) 
Donaldson Lake (Timiskaming District) 
Donar Lake 
Doncaster Lake 
Donch Lake 
Donnegana Lake 
Donnelly Lake (Manitumieg Lake, Kenora District)
Donnelly Lake (Muskoka District) 
Donnelly Lake (Donnelly River, Kenora District)
Donnet Lake 
Donovan Lake 
Donovans Lake 
Donson Lake 
Donut Lake 
Dools Lake 
Doon Lake 
Doone Lake 
Dooners Pond 
Door Lake 
Dope Lake 
Dora Lake (Pinard Township, Cochrane District)
Dora Lake (Timiskaming District) 
Dora Lake (Cochrane)
Dora Lake (Parry Sound District) 
Dora Lake (Kenora District) 
Dora Lake (Thunder Bay District) 
Dorami Lake 
Doran Lake (Frontenac County) 
Doran Lake (Algoma District) 
Doran Lake (Timiskaming District) 
Doran Lake (Thunder Bay District) 
Doran Lake (Simcoe County) 
Doran's Lake 
Doré Lake (Algoma District) 
Doré Lake (Kenora District) 
Doré Lake (Rainy River District)
Doreen Lake 
Dorigo Lake 
Doris Lake (Thunder Bay District) 
Doris Lake (Sudbury District) 
Doris Lake (Nipissing District) 
Dorman Lake 
Dorosh Lake 
Dorothy Lake (Timiskaming District) 
Dorothy Lake (Sudbury District) 
Dorothy Lake (Rainy River District) 
Dorothy Lake (Trout River, Kenora District)
Dorothy Lake (Dobie River, Kenora District)
Dorothy Lake (Thunder Bay District) 
Dorsalfin Lake 
Dorsey Lake 
Dory Lake (Cochrane District) 
Dory Lake (Kenora District) 
Doss Lake 
Dossier Lake 
Dot Lake (Misehkow River, Thunder Bay District)
Dot Lake (Robbie Creek, Thunder Bay District)
Dot Lake (Muskoka District) 
Dot Pond 
Dotted Lake (Thunder Bay District) 
Dotted Lake (Kenora District) 
Dottie Lake 
Dotty Lake 
Double Lake (Upper Manitou Lake, Kenora District)
Double Lake (Rainy River District) 
Double Lake (Cedar River, Kenora District)
Double Loon Lake 
Double Track Lake 
Doubloon Lake 
Doubtful Lake (Sioux Narrows-Nestor Falls)
Doubtful Lake (North Caribou Lake, Kenora District)
Doubtful Lake (Sudbury District) 
Doucette Lake 
Doug Lake 
Dougall Lake (Algoma District) 
Dougall Lake (Thunder Bay District) 
Dougherty Lake (Sudbury District) 
Dougherty Lake (Cochrane District) 
Doughnut Lake (Thunder Bay District) 
Doughnut Lake (Muskoka District) 
Douglas Lake (Frost Township, Algoma District)
Douglas Lake (Mulcahy Township, Kenora District)
Douglas Lake (Black River-Matheson)
Douglas Lake (Lake of the Woods, Kenora District)
Douglas Lake (Simcoe County) 
Douglas Lake (Muskoka District) 
Douglas Lake (Guilfoyle Township, Cochrane District)
Douglas Lake (Douglas Creek, Kenora District)
Douglas Lake (Garden River 14)
Dougs Lake 
Doule Lake 
Doull Lake 
Dove Lake (Thunder Bay District) 
Dove Lake (Nipissing District) 
Dovetail Lake 
Dow Lake 
Dow's Lake 
Dowden Lake 
Dowes Lake 
Dowie Lake 
Dowling Lake 
Downer Lake 
Downes Lake 
Downey Lake (Timiskaming District) 
Downey Lake (Thunder Bay District) 
Downhill Lake 
Downie Lake 
Dowsett Lake 
Dowsley Lake 
Dowswell Lake 
Doyle Lake (Kenora District) 
Doyle Lake (Algoma District) 
Doyle Lake (Sudbury District) 
Doyle Lake (Renfrew County) 
Doze Lake 
Dozy Lake

Dr
Drag Lake (Hastings County) 
Drag Lake (Haliburton County) 
Dragon Lake (Rainy River District) 
Dragon Lake (Thunder Bay District) 
Dragonfly Lake 
Drake Lake (Rainy River District) 
Drake Lake (Kenora District) 
Draper Lake (Frontenac County) 
Draper Lake (Parry Sound District) 
Draper Lake (Sudbury District) 
Draper Lake (Rainy River District) 
Drawdi Lake 
Draycot Lake 
Dreamhaven Lake 
Dreamy Lake 
Dreany Lake (Algoma District) 
Dreany Lake (Nipissing District) 
Drefal Lake 
Drefkes Lake 
Drew Lake 
Drewery Lake 
Drewry Lake 
Drexler Lakes 
Drict Lake 
Drie Lake 
Drift Lake 
Driftstone Lake 
Driftwood Lake 
Drill Lake 
Driscoll Lake 
Drive Lake 
Driver Lake (Parry Sound District) 
Driver Lake (Kenora District) 
Driving Lake 
Drizzle Lake 
Drohan Lake 
Drohans Ponds 
Drop Lake (Timiskaming District) 
Drop Lake (Kenora District) 
Dropledge Lake 
Drowsy Lake 
Druces Lake 
Drum Lake (Osprey Lake, Kenora District)
Drum Lake (Drum Creek, Kenora District)
Drumlin Lake 
Drumm Lake 
Drummer Lake 
Drurys Pond 
Dry Lake (Stone Mills)
Dry Lake (Renfrew County) 
Dry Lake (Cascaden Township, Sudbury District)
Dry Lake (Sladen Township, Sudbury District)
Dry Lake (Nipissing District) 
Dry Lake (Thunder Bay District) 
Dry Lake (Addington Highlands)
Dry Lake (Haldimand County) 
Dry Lake (Kenora District) 
Dry Lake (Hastings County) 
Dry Lakes 
Dryberry Lake 
Drynan Lake 
Drysdales Pond

Du
Dua Lake 
Dub Lake 
Dubbelewe Lake 
Dube Lake 
Dubé Lake 
Dublin Lake 
Dubrois Lake 
Dubroy Lake (Algoma District) 
Dubroy Lake (Thunder Bay District) 
Dubroy Lake (Cochrane District) 
Ducell Lake 
Duchabani Lake 
Ducharme Lake (Nipissing District) 
Ducharme Lake (Kenora District) 
Duchesnay Lake 
Duck Lake (Rioux Township, Algoma District)
Duck Lake (Blind River) 
Duck Lake (Nipissing)
Duck Lake (Craig Township, Sudbury District)
Duck Lake (Brown Township, Parry Sound District)
Duck Lake (Timmins)
Duck Lake (Kawartha Lakes) 
Duck Lake (Kenora District) 
Duck Lake (Hastings County) 
Duck Lake (Renfrew County) 
Duck Lake (Frontenac County) 
Duck Lake (Haliburton County) 
Duck Lake (Rainy River District) 
Duck Lake (O'Brien Township, Cochrane District)
Duck Lake (Seguin)
Duck Lake (Nipissing District) 
Duck Lake (Duck Creek, Thunder Bay District)
Duck Lake (Kearney)
Duck Lake (Wilson Township, Parry Sound District)
Duck Lake (Roberts Township, Sudbury District)
Duck Lake (Terrace Bay)
Duck Pond (Peterborough County) 
Duck Pond (Kenora District) 
Duckbill Lake (Sudbury District) 
Duckbill Lake (Thunder Bay District) 
Duckbreast Lake 
Duckling Lake (Thunder Bay District) 
Duckling Lake (Kenora District) 
Ducknest Lake 
Duckpond Lake 
Ducks Egg Lake 
Duckshead Lake 
Duckwing Lake 
Dud Lake (Kenora District) 
Dud Lake (Sudbury District) 
Dud Lake (Thunder Bay District) 
Dude Lake 
Dufault Lake 
Duff Lake (Sudbury District) 
Duff Lake (West Nipissing)
Duff Lake (Bronson Township, Nipissing District0
Duff Lake (Rainy River District) 
Duffell Lake 
Dufferin Lake 
Duffy Lake 
Duffy Lakes 
Duffys Lake 
Dufton Lake 
Dugal Lake 
Dugan Lake 
Duggan Lake 
Dugout Lake 
Duguay Lake 
Dugwal Pit 
Duhaime Lake 
Duke Lake (Renfrew County) 
Duke Lake (Sudbury District) 
Duke Lake (Algoma District) 
Dumas Lake (Thunder Bay District) 
Dumas Lake (Rainy River District) 
Dumbbell Lake (Rainy River District) 
Dumbbell Lake (Murky Creek, Thunder Bay District)
Dumbbell Lake (Kenora District) 
Dumbbell Lake (Long Lake, Thunder Bay District)
Dumbell Lake (Mons Township, Algoma District)
Dumbell Lake (Sudbury District) 
Dumbell Lake (Simcoe County) 
Dumbell Lake (Assef Township, Algoma District)
Dumbell Lake (Elliot Lake)
Dumbell Lakes 
Dummy Lake 
Dumond Lake (Timiskaming District) 
Dumond Lake (Nipissing District) 
Dumont Lake 
Dump Lake (Thunder Bay District) 
Dump Lake (Renfrew County) 
Dump Lake (Parry Sound District) 
Dumpy Lake 
Dun Lake 
Dunbar Lake (Sudbury District) 
Dunbar Lake (Timiskaming District) 
Dunbar Lake (Parry Sound District) 
Dunbar Lake (Kenora District) 
Dunbar Lake (Leeds and Grenville United Counties) 
Dunbrack Lake 
Dunc Lake 
Duncan Lake (Nipissing District) 
Duncan Lake (Frontenac County) 
Duncan Lake (Grey County) 
Duncan Lake (Parry Sound District) 
Duncan Lake (Rainy River District) 
Duncan Lake (Timiskaming District) 
Duncan Lake (Sudbury District) 
Duncan's Pond 
Duncannon Lake 
Duncanson Lake 
Dunchurch Lake 
Duncs Lake 
Dundonald Lake 
Dunham Lake 
Dunkel Lake 
Dunkerley Lake 
Dunkirk Lake 
Dunlop Lake (Renfrew County) 
Dunlop Lake (Algoma District) 
Dunmark Lake 
Dunn Lake (Muskoka District) 
Dunn Lake (Kenora District) 
Dunn Lake (Cochrane District) 
Dunne Lake (Shikag River, Thunder Bay District)
Dunne Lake (Cochrane District) 
Dunne Lake (Sudbury District) 
Dunne Lake (Upper Roslyn Lake, Thunder Bay District)
Dunnet Lake 
Dunns Lake (North Algona Wilberforce)
Dunns Lake (Head, Clara and Maria)
Dunns Lakes 
Dunphy Lake 
Dunrankin Lake 
Duns Lake 
Dunstan Lake (Kenora District) 
Dunstan Lake (Parry Sound District) 
Duplex Lake 
Duplicate Lakes 
Dupre Lake 
Dupuis Lake 
Dural Lake 
Duralia Lake 
Durban Lake 
Durer Lake 
Durie Lake 
Durkee Lake 
Durkin Lake 
Durn Lake 
Durnell Lake 
Durocher Lake 
Durrel Lake 
Durrell Lake (Kenora District) 
Durrell Lake (Parry Sound District) 
Dusey Lake 
Dusk Lake (Cochrane District) 
Dusk Lake (Nipissing District)
Dusk Lake (Parry Sound District)
Dusky Lake 
Dusten Lake 
Dusty Lake (Thunder Bay District) 
Dusty Lake (Algoma District) 
Dutch Lake 
Dutcher Lake 
Dutchman Lake 
Dutchmans Lake 
Duthorne Lake 
Dutton Lake 
Duval Lake 
Duxfield Lake

Dw–Dy
Dwight Lake 
Dwy Lake 
Dwyer Lake 
Dycie Lake 
Dyelle Lake 
Dyer Lake (Thunder Bay District) 
Dyer Lake (Cochrane District) 
Dyer Lake (Algoma District) 
Dyment Lake (Sudbury District) 
Dyment Lake (Algoma District) 
Dymond Lake (Devine Township, Nipissing District)
Dymond Lake (McAuslan Township, Nipissing District)
Dyson Lake (Algoma District) 
Dyson Lake (Parry Sound District)

External links
Natural Resources Canada Geographical Names Data Base Geographical Names Data (Ontario)

References
 Geographical Names Data Base, Natural Resources Canada

D